The Kuala Lipis railway station is a Malaysian train station stationed at and named after the town of Kuala Lipis, Lipis District, Pahang.

It is a major stop; shuttle trains to Tumpat start here.

Train services
 Ekspres Rakyat Timuran 26/27 Tumpat–JB Sentral
 Ekspres Makmur 34/35 Kuala Lipis–Gemas
 Shuttle Timur 50/53/58/59 Gua Musang–Kuala Lipis

Bus connection

References

External links 

KTM / MRT Line Integrations

KTM East Coast Line stations
Lipis District
Railway stations in Pahang